Lolab Assembly constituency is one of the 87 constituencies in the Jammu and Kashmir Legislative Assembly of Jammu and Kashmir a north state of India. Lolab Valley is also part of Baramulla Lok Sabha constituency.

Member of Legislative Assembly
 1962: Ghulam Nabi Wani, Jammu & Kashmir National Conference
 1967: Ghulam Nabi Wani, Indian National Congress
 1996: Mushtaq Ahmad Lone, Jammu & Kashmir National Conference
 2002: Qaiser Ahmed Lone, Jammu & Kashmir National Conference
 2008: Abdul Haq Khan, Jammu and Kashmir Peoples Democratic Party

Election results

2014

See also
 Lolab Valley
 Kupwara district
 List of constituencies of Jammu and Kashmir Legislative Assembly

References

Assembly constituencies of Jammu and Kashmir
Kupwara district